Prostacheoceras is genus of ammonoid cephalopods belonging to the Vidrioceratidae family. Species belonging to this genus lived in early to middle Permian.

Species and distribution

 Prostacheoceras alter Leonova, 1989: Artinskian - Roadian of Tajikistan and Thailand
 Prostacheoceras benedictinum Gemmellaro, 1887: Wordian of Italy
 Prostacheoceras burnense Tumanskaia, 1931: Roadian of Russia (Crimea)
 Prostacheoceras chinense Wang, 1983: Asselian - Wordian of China (Xinjiang). Nomen nudum, as it is based only on fragmentary specimen. Unsure age assignment.
 Prostacheoceras darvasicum Leonova, 1992: Kungurian of Tajikistan
 Prostacheoceras dentatum Ruzhentsev, 1938: synonym of P. juresanense
 Prostacheoceras geminum Ruzhentsev, 1938: synonym of P. juresanense
 Prostacheoceras juresanense Maksimova, 1935: Asselian of Kazakhstan (South Urals), Russia (South Urals)
 Prostacheoceras langi Termier & Termier, 1970: Artinskian - Kungurian of Afghanistan and China (Xinjiang)
 Prostacheoceras longilobatum Liang, 1982: Wordian of China (Jilin)
 Prostacheoceras multidentatum Tumanskaia, 1931: Roadian of Russia (Crimea). Nomen nudum.
 Prostacheoceras oschense Tumanskaia, 1938: Roadian - Wordian of Tajikistan
 Prostacheoceras principale Bogoslovskaia & Popov, 1986: Asselian of Kazakhstan (South Urals)
 Prostacheoceras saundersi Nassichuk, 1977: Wordian of Canada (British Columbia)
 Prostacheoceras shaoyangense Zhou, 1987: Wordian - Capitanian of China (Hunan)
 Prostacheoceras skinneri Miller, 1945: Kungurian of Malaysia and USA (Texas)
 Prostacheoceras strictum Bogoslovskaia, 1978: Asselian of Tajikistan
 Prostacheoceras tauricum Tumanskaia, 1917: Roadian of Russia (Crimea)

References

Goniatitida genera
Cyclolobaceae
Permian ammonites
Ammonites of Europe
Cisuralian first appearances
Guadalupian genus extinctions
Paleozoic life of British Columbia